Since Hawaii became a state in 1959, it has sent congressional delegations to the United States Senate and United States House of Representatives. Each state elects two senators to serve for six years. Members of the House of Representatives are elected to two-year terms, one from each of Hawaii's congressional districts. Before becoming a state, the Territory of Hawaii elected a non-voting delegate at-large to Congress from 1900 to 1958.

The longest-serving senator was Daniel Inouye, from 1963 to 2012—he served as President pro tempore of the United States Senate from 2010 to 2012 as the longest-serving senator. Patsy Mink was the first woman of color to serve in the House, and the first woman to represent Hawaii in Congress.

Current delegation 

Hawaii's current congressional delegation in the 118th Congress consists of its two senators and two representatives, all of whom are Democrats.

The current dean of the Hawaii delegation is Mazie Hirono, having served in the Senate since 2013 and in Congress since 2007.

United States Senate 

Each state elects two senators by statewide popular vote every six years. The terms of the two senators are staggered so that they are not elected in the same year, meaning that each seat also has a class determining the years in which the seat will be up for election. Hawaii's senators are elected in classes 1 and 3.

There have been seven senators elected from Hawaii, of whom six have been Democrats and one has been a Republican. Hawaii's current senators, both Democrats, are Mazie Hirono, in office since 2013, and Brian Schatz, in office since 2012.

U.S. House of Representatives

Territorial delegates 
The Territory of Hawaii was an organized incorporated territory of the United States formed by the Hawaiian Organic Act on April 30, 1900, following the annexation of Hawaii. The territory initially consisted of the Hawaiian Islands, although the Palmyra Atoll was separated from Hawaii when it was admitted into the Union.

The territorial delegates were elected to two-year terms from the at-large congressional district in the Hawaii Territory. Delegates were allowed to serve on committees, debate, and submit legislation, but were not permitted to vote on bills. The first delegate, Robert William Wilcox, took office on December 15, 1900, and the last delegate, John A. Burns, left office on August 21, 1959, succeeded on the same day by representative Daniel Inouye. Delegates only served in the House of Representatives, as there was no representation in the Senate until Hawaii became a state.

Representatives from the State of Hawaii 
Members of the House of Representatives are elected every two years by popular vote within a congressional district. From in the 86th Congress through the 91st Congress, both of Hawaii's representatives were elected from Hawaii's at-large congressional district, but in 1969, the Hawaii legislature passed a law creating Hawaii's first and second congressional district, which elected representatives to the 92nd Congress. The representatives from the two new districts, Patsy Mink and Spark Matsunaga, were also the last two representatives of the seats in the at-large district. Every ten years, the number of seats in the House apportioned to every state is recalculated based on the state's population as determined by the United States census. Hawaii had one seat until the 1960 United States census allotted Hawaii a second seat, which was first filled by Thomas Gill in the 1962 House elections.

See also

List of United States congressional districts
Hawaii's congressional districts
Political party strength in Hawaii

Notes

References 

Politics of Hawaii
Congressional Delegations
 
 
Hawaii